Dorie may refer to:

Pierre-Henri Dorie (1839–1866), French missionary and martyr in Korea
Dorie Greenspan, American author of cookbooks
Dorie Murrey (born 1943), American retired National Basketball Association player
Doris Miller (1919-1943), nicknamed "Dorie", African-American US Navy cook who distinguished himself during the attack on Pearl Harbor

See also
Dory (disambiguation)
Dorrie, name
Dorries, a list of people with the surname